Christian Fennesz (born 25 December 1962) is an Austrian producer and guitarist active in electronic music since the 1990s, often credited simply by his last name. His work utilizes guitar and laptop computers to blend melody with treated samples and glitch production. He lives and works in Vienna, and currently records on the UK label Touch.

Fennesz first received widespread recognition for his 2001 album Endless Summer, released on the Austrian label Mego. He has collaborated with a number of artists, including Ryuichi Sakamoto, Jim O'Rourke, Ulver, David Sylvian, and King Midas Sound.

Biography 
Fennesz was born and raised in Austria and studied music formally in art school. He started playing guitar around the age of 8 or 9. He initially performed as a member of the Austrian experimental rock band Maische before signing to electronic music label Mego as a solo artist. The influence of techno led him to begin composing with a laptop. In 1995 he released his first EP Instrument, which explored electro-acoustic and ambient stylings.

In 1997, Fennesz released his debut full-length album Hotel Paral.lel, which saw him delve more explicitly into laptop production and early glitch aesthetics. He followed with the 1998 single Plays, which contained near-unrecognizable covers of the Rolling Stones' "Paint It Black" and the Beach Boys' "Don't Talk (Put Your Head on My Shoulder)". In the following years, he collaborated with a variety of artists, including Peter "Pita" Rehberg and Jim O'Rourke as part of Fenn O'Berg. In 2001, he released his third studio album Endless Summer to widespread critical praise and recognition. He collaborated with figures such as David Sylvian, Keith Rowe, eRikm, Ryuichi Sakamoto in the following years, and released the albums Venice (2004) and Black Sea (2007) to further critical praise.

In 2009 Fennesz teamed up with Mark Linkous (Sparklehorse) to create In the Fishtank 15. The following year Fennesz released Szampler, a cassette containing his sample collection on the Tapeworm label. This release was later remixed by Stefan Goldmann and released as Goldmann vs. Fennesz: Remiksz. In 2011, he appeared on the live Ulver release The Norwegian National Opera, contributing guitar and effects to "Not Saved." In November 2013, Fennesz played the final holiday camp edition of the All Tomorrow's Parties festival in Camber Sands, England. In 2014, he released the studio album Bécs. In 2015, he collaborated with UK group King Midas Sound on the album Editions 1.

Recording techniques
Since the 1990s, Fennesz has worked with the programming software Max/MSP and the free patch Ppooll, which he runs in conjunction with the workstation Logic 9. In both studio and live settings, he routes his guitar through effects pedals (including a custom distortion box) and into his computer. There, it is processed and combined with Ppooll software plugins and tools such as samplers, synthesizers, effects, and MIDI controllers.

Discography 
 Studio albums
 (1997) Hotel Paral.lel (Mego)
 (1999) Plus Forty Seven Degrees 56' 37" Minus Sixteen Degrees 51' 08" (Touch)
 (2001) Endless Summer (Mego)
 (2004) Venice (Touch)
 (2008) Black Sea (Touch)
 (2014) Bécs (Editions Mego)
 (2019) Agora (Touch)

 Collaboration albums
 (2004) GRM Experience with Mika Vainio & Christian Zanési (Signature)
 (2005) Cloud with Keith Rowe, Toshimaru Nakamura and Oren Ambarchi (Erstwhile)
 (2007) Cendre with Sakamoto (Touch)
 (2008) Til the Old World's Blown Up and a New One Is Created with  Martin Brandlmayr & Werner Dafeldecker (Mosz)
 (2009) In the Fishtank 15 with Sparklehorse (Konkurrent)
 (2010) Knoxville with David Daniell and Tony Buck (Thrill Jockey)
 (2010) Remiksz with Stefan Goldmann (Tapeworm)
 (2011) Flumina with Sakamoto (Commmons/Touch)
 (2015) Edition 1 with King Midas Sound (Ninja Tune)
 (2015) AirEffect with OZmotic (Folk Wisdom)
 (2016) It's Hard For Me To Say I'm Sorry with Jim O'Rourke (Editions Mego)

 Compilations
 (2002) Field Recordings: 1995–2002 (Touch)
 (2010) Szampler (Tapeworm)

 Live recordings
 (2000) Live at Revolver, Melbourne live EP (Touch)
 (2004) Live at the LU with Keith Rowe (Erstwhile)
 (2005) Sala Santa Cecilia live EP with Ryuichi Sakamoto (Touch)
 (2005) Live in Japan CD (Headz/Touch, 2003) and LP (Autofact/Touch)
 (2009) Live @ The V. Sessions streaming video recording (The V. Sessions), 2009
 (2014) Mahler Remixed vinyl (Touch)

 Studio EPs
 (1995) Instrument 12" vinyl (Mego)
 (1998) Il Libro Mio EP (Tanz Hotel)
 (1998) Plays 7" (Mego)
 (1999) Plays CDEP (Moikai)
 (2006) Plays 10" vinyl (Editions Mego)
 (2011) Seven Stars CDEP/10" vinyl (Touch)

 Singles, tracks, guest collaborations, etc.
 (2002) "Wrapped Islands" with Polwechsel (Erstwhile)
 (2005) "Erstlive 004" with Peter Rehberg, Sachiko M and Otomo Yoshihide (Erstwhile)
 (2007) "On a desolate shore a shadow passes by" (Touch) – download only
 (2008) "Transition" (Touch)
 (2008) "Saffron Revolution" (Touch) – download only
 (2010) "Future Back" and "Impassive Skies" with Patrick Pulsinger, on Pulsinger's album Impassive Skies (Disko B)
 (2011) "Fearless" (Thrill Jockey) – contribution for the Benefit for the Recovery in Japan compilation

 Remixes
 (2001) "IVEND 00", based on material from Attention: Cats by Various Artists, on rkk13cd (Reckankreuzungsklankewerkzeuge)
 (2003) Remixed "Tomorrow Never Knows" and "The Future Sound Of Music" (titled "Only the Poor have to Travel") by Ulver on 1993–2003: A Decade In The Machines (Jester Records)
 (2005) Remixed "Weight" by Isis on Oceanic Remixes Vol. 4 (Ipecac)
 (2007) Remixed "In This Twilight" by Nine Inch Nails on Year Zero Remixed (Interscope)
 (2010) Remixed "Returnal" by Oneohtrix Point Never on Returnal Maxi Single 7" (Editions Mego)
 (2011) Remixed "The Visitor" by Miracle on Fluid Window (2011) Remixed "Shikaku Kakumei" (titled "QSMJAF") by Sōtaisei Riron on Tadashii Sōtaisei Riron (Commmons/Mirai Records)

 Soundtracks
 (1999) Beyond the Ocean (USA)
 (2000) Gelbe Kirschen (Austria), directed by Leopold Lummerstorfer
 (2002) Blue Moon (Austria), written and directed by Andrea Maria Dusl
 (2005) Platform#09 Chicago (France) directed by Cedrick Eymenier
 (2009) Film ist. a girl & a gun (Austria), directed by Gustav Deutsch, with Lucía Pulido, Martin Siewert, Burkhard Stangl (7", Interstellar Records, Austria 2009)
 (2012) AUN: The Beginning and the End of All Things (Ash International)

 In Fenn O'Berg
 (1999) The Magic Sound of Fenn O'Berg (Mego)
 (2002) The Return of Fenn O'Berg (Mego)
 (2009) Magic & Return Double CD reissue (Editions Mego)
 (2010) In Stereo (Mego)

 Tribute to Fennesz
 (2004) Tim Hecker "Mirages" (Alien8 Recordings) – Incurably optimistic
 (2012) Lcoma "Fennesz" (Unsigned) – Musical influence

 With FoodQuiet Inlet (ECM, 2010)Mercurial Balm (ECM, 2012)This Is Not a Miracle'' (ECM, 2015)

See also 
List of ambient music artists

References

External links 

 Fennesz.com – Official website
 Biography of Fennesz at Touch Music
 Fennesz at Mego
 Exclaim interview (02/2009)
 Semtex Magazine interview (02/2006)
 Pitchfork interview (03/2002)
 Fennesz RBMA lecture

1962 births
Living people
Austrian electronic musicians
Austrian guitarists
Electroacoustic improvisation
Experimental musicians
Free improvisation
Drag City (record label) artists